The 2020–21 Martyr's Memorial B-Division League was the 2020-21 season of the Martyr's Memorial B-Division League. A total of 12 teams competed in the league. The season started on 23 February and concluded on 5 March.

On 18 March 2020, the All Nepal Football Association suspended the League due to the coronavirus pandemic after matchday 5. On 23 December 2020, it was decided that the league would resume on 23 February 2021. On 7 March 2021, Satdobato Youth Club were crowned champions and were promoted to the Martyr's Memorial A-Division League.

Teams

Personnel and kits

League table

Awards

Broadcast rights
All matches were streamed live on MyCujoo.

References 

Martyr's Memorial B-Division League seasons
2019–20 in Nepalese football